Hampton is a locality in the Central West region of New South Wales, Australia.

References

External links

Towns in New South Wales
City of Lithgow